Figure skating at the 1956 Winter Olympics took place at the Olympic Ice Stadium in Cortina d'Ampezzo, Italy. Three figure skating events were contested: men's singles, ladies' singles, and pair skating.

Medal summary

Results

Men

Referee:
  Werner Rittberger

Assistant Referee:
  Walter S. Powell

Judges:
  Sydney R. Croll
  Hans Meixler
  Ralph S. McCreath
  Emil Skákala
  Gérard Rodrigues Henriques
  Adolf Walker
  Pauline Barrajo
  H. Kendall Kelley
  Jean Kreuz

Ladies

Referee:
  Adolf Rosdol

Assistant Referee:
  Ercole Cattaneo

Judges:
  Sydney R. Croll
  Oscar Madol
  Ralph S. McCreath
  Josef Dědič
  Gérard Rodrigues Henriques
  Adolf Walker
  Mollie Phillips
  Mario Verdi
  Charlotte Benedict Stieber
  H. Kendall Kelley
  Jean Creux

Pairs

Referee:
  Gustavus F.C. Witt

Assistant Referee:
  Marcel Nicaise

Judges:
  Sydney R. Croll
  Hans Meixner
  Ralph S. McCreath
  Emil Skákala
  Rudolf A. Marx
  H. Kendall Kelley
  Pamela Davis
  Zoltán Balász
  Jean Creux

References

External links
 Official Olympic report
 Results at sports-reference.com
 results

 
1956 Winter Olympics events
1956
Olympics
International figure skating competitions hosted by Italy